The 1964 San Francisco Giants season was the Giants' 82nd year in Major League Baseball, their seventh year in San Francisco since their move from New York following the 1957 season, and their fifth at Candlestick Park. The team finished in fourth place, as a result of their 90–72 record, placing them three games behind the National League and World Series Champion St. Louis Cardinals.

Offseason 
 October 1, 1963: Jimmie Coker was traded by the Giants to the St. Louis Cardinals for Ken MacKenzie.
 October 10, 1963: Jack Fisher was drafted from the Giants by the New York Mets in a 1963 special draft.
 March 29, 1964: Joey Amalfitano was purchased from the Giants by the Chicago Cubs.
 April 14, 1964: Duke Snider was purchased by the Giants from the New York Mets

Spring training 
The Giants held spring training games at Phoenix Municipal Stadium, which opened in 1964. In the first game at Phoenix Muni on March 8, 1964, the Giants beat Cleveland, 6 to 2. Willie Mays hit the first home run at the park, in front of a crowd of 8,582. In attendance for the dedication ceremonies were Commissioner Ford Frick, National League President Warren Giles, and Giants owner Horace Stoneham.

Regular season

Season standings

Record vs. opponents

Opening Day starters 
Orlando Cepeda
Jim Davenport
Tom Haller
Jim Ray Hart
Harvey Kuenn
Juan Marichal
Willie Mays
Willie McCovey
José Pagán

Roster

Player stats

Batting

Starters by position 
Note: Pos = Position; G = Games played; AB = At bats; H = Hits; Avg. = Batting average; HR = Home runs; RBI = Runs batted in

Other batters 
Note: G = Games played; AB = At bats; H = Hits; Avg. = Batting average; HR = Home runs; RBI = Runs batted in

Pitching

Starting pitchers 
Note: G = Games pitched; IP = Innings pitched; W = Wins; L = Losses; ERA = Earned run average; SO = Strikeouts

Other pitchers 
Note: G = Games pitched; IP = Innings pitched; W = Wins; L = Losses; ERA = Earned run average; SO = Strikeouts

Relief pitchers 
Note: G = Games pitched; W = Wins; L = Losses; SV = Saves; ERA = Earned run average; SO = Strikeouts

Awards and honors 

All-Star Game
Orlando Cepeda, first base, starter
Juan Marichal, reserve
Willie Mays, outfield, starter

Farm system 

LEAGUE CHAMPIONS: Fresno

Notes

References 
 1964 San Francisco Giants team at Baseball-Reference
 1964 San Francisco Giants team page at Baseball Almanac

San Francisco Giants seasons
San Francisco Giants season
San Fran